Olympic Dam may refer to:
 The town of Olympic Dam in South Australia
Olympic Dam Airport, South Australia
Olympic Dam mine, a copper, uranium, gold and silver mining centre in South Australia
 The Olympic Dam Highway which runs from the Stuart Highway to the town of Olympic Dam